Upload Cinema is a Dutch organization that screens bi-monthly, thematic compilation programs of web videos in cinemas. Since 2008, the screenings took place in De Uitkijk, a cinema in Amsterdam. Later, screenings were being held in cinemas in other cities in the Netherlands, Belgium and Spain and at events such as Lowlands music festival, International Film Festival Rotterdam and the Movies that Matter Festival. In 2010, the programs were screened twice in De Uitkijk due to larger public interest. The Amsterdam screenings were relocated to Rialto, a larger cinema in Amsterdam, in October 2011.

The film programs are compiled thematically by Upload Cinema's editors. The editorial team of Upload Cinema consists of its originators Dagan Cohen and Barbara de Wijn, and film enthusiasts such as editors of the NRC newspaper and Filmkrant. For each edition, the editorial team is also being joined by one or two guest editors. Upload Cinema regularly cooperates with other cultural organizations in the production of its programs. For instance, the program for December 2010 was produced in cooperation with broadcasting association AVRO.

In cooperation with another broadcasting association, NTR, Upload Cinema compiled a live television program around the theme of viral videos named De Nacht van de Korte Film (The Night of the Short Film). This program was broadcast in September 2011 on Dutch television channel Nederland 2 and hosted by Isolde Hallensleben and Dagan Cohen. Cohen has also regularly been present as a guest in television program De Wereld Draait Door as an internet video expert.

External links
Official website

Film organisations in the Netherlands